The Dongfeng Fengxing Jingyi X3 is a subcompact CUV produced by Dongfeng Liuzhou Motor under the Jingyi product series of the Dongfeng Fengxing sub-brand.

Overview
The Fengxing Jingyi X3 is positioned under the first generation Dongfeng Fengxing Jingyi X5 compact MPV it shares the platform with at launch. It was launched in 2014 with prices ranges from 66,900 yuan to 86,900 yuan. Design is similar to the facelifted Dongfeng Fengxing Jingyi X5 I as the two vehicle shares the same platform. A minor facelift was launched in 2016 refreshing the front grilles.

References

External links
Fengxing Jingyi X3 Official website

2010s cars
Cars introduced in 2014
Cars of China
Crossover sport utility vehicles
Fengxing Jingyi X3
Front-wheel-drive vehicles
Mini sport utility vehicles